Pilgrim's Rest, also known as Belle Mont Grove and Mount Wesley, is a historic home and national historic district located near Nokesville, Prince William County, Virginia. It dates to the 18th century, and is a -story, three-bay, Tidewater style, frame dwelling with a double-pile, side hall plan. It has a one-story, gable-roofed, rebuilt kitchen and dining addition dated to 1956, when the house was remodeled. The house features a pair of unusual exterior brick chimneys on the south end with a two-story pent closet. Also included in the district are a late-19th century frame granary / barn, a frame, gable-roofed tool shed, and an icehouse constructed of concrete block with a metal gable roof. In 1996–1998, the Kinsley Granary was moved from the Buckland area of Prince William County, and is a -story stone structure that was rebuilt as a guest house.

It was added to the National Register of Historic Places in 1989, with a boundary increase in 2004.

References

External links
 Pilgrim's Rest, State Route 607 vicinity, Aden, Prince William County, VA: 3 photos at Historic American Buildings Survey

Historic American Buildings Survey in Virginia
Houses on the National Register of Historic Places in Virginia
Historic districts on the National Register of Historic Places in Virginia
Colonial architecture in Virginia
Houses in Prince William County, Virginia
National Register of Historic Places in Prince William County, Virginia